The United States interests in Monaco are represented from the U.S. Embassy in Paris and U.S. Consulate General in Marseille, France. Full diplomatic relations between Monaco and the United States were established in December 2006 and the ambassador Craig Roberts Stapleton to France was accredited to Monaco. The Consulate General in Marseille handles most of working-level contacts with Monaco.

President Joe Biden nominated former US ambassador to Belgium and Women for Biden executive director Denise Campbell Bauer for the position on June 9, 2021. She was sworn in on December 23, 2021.

U.S. Ambassadors accredited to Monaco
 Craig Roberts Stapleton 2005–2009
 Charles Rivkin 2009–2013.
 Jane D. Hartley 2014–2017
 Jamie McCourt 2017–2021
 Denise Bauer 2022–present

See also
Monaco–United States relations
Foreign relations of Monaco
Ambassadors of the United States
Maguy Maccario Doyle

References

United States Department of State: Background notes on Monaco

External links
 United States Department of State: Chiefs of Mission for Monaco
 United States Department of State: Monaco
 United States Embassy in Paris

 01
Monaco
United States